Tallington railway station was a station in Tallington, Lincolnshire on the Great Northern Railway between Grantham and Peterborough. It was closed in 1959, however the former goods yard is still open and is used by the Dow-Mac works at Tallington for delivery of concrete beams, bridge supports, sleepers, etc. by rail.

References

Disused railway stations in Lincolnshire
Railway stations in Great Britain opened in 1853
Railway stations in Great Britain closed in 1959
Former Great Northern Railway stations